Computer!Totaal, conveniently abbreviated as C!T, is a Dutch monthly magazine about computers and related subjects. It is the largest computer magazine of the Netherlands.

History and profile
Originally, C!T was the newsletter of the Hobby Computer Club (HCC) and was called HCC Nieuwsbrief. The magazine was started in 1977. It was renamed to the current name in 1992. On 1 October 2008, IDG and HCC terminated their co-operation. From that date onwards, HCC membership and the HCC Nieuwsbrief subscription were no longer linked.

C!T is published by IDG Nederland and part of IDG's PC World product line.

See also
 Personal Computer Magazine, another Dutch computer magazine, published by HUB Uitgevers.
 PC World (magazine), international equivalent published by IDG (also available in a Dutch edition).

Notes

References

External links 
  
 IDG: Computer!Totaal, PC World Belgium
  ADSL!Totaal website
  Press release about the ADSL!Totaal launch

1977 establishments in the Netherlands
Computer magazines published in the Netherlands
Dutch-language magazines
Monthly magazines published in the Netherlands
International Data Group
Magazines established in 1977